Glenn L. Howard (25 August 1939 – 2 July 2012) was a Democratic member of the Indiana Senate, representing the 33rd District from 1992 to 2009.

References

External links
Indiana State Legislature - Senator Glenn L. Howard Official government website
Project Vote Smart - Senator Glenn L. Howard (IN) profile
Follow the Money - Glenn L. Howard
2006 2004 2002 2000 1998 1996 campaign contributions

Democratic Party Indiana state senators
1939 births
2012 deaths
Politicians from Indianapolis
Indianapolis City-County Council members